Anupamaa is an Indian Hindi-language television drama series that premiered on 13 July 2020 on Star Plus and streams digitally on Disney+ Hotstar. Produced by Rajan Shahi and Deepa Shahi under the banner of Director's Kut Productions, it stars Rupali Ganguly and Sudhanshu Pandey. It is loosely based on Star Jalsha's Bengali series Sreemoyee.

Plot

Cast

Main
 Rupali Ganguly as Anupamaa "Anu" Kapadia: Kanta's daughter; Bhavesh's sister; Vanraj's former wife; Anuj's wife; Paritosh, Samar and Pakhi's mother; Kinjal,Adhik's mother in law, Anu's foster mother (2020–present)
 Sudhanshu Pandey as Vanraj "V" Shah: Leela and Hasmukh's son; Dolly's brother; Anupamaa's former husband; Kavya's husband; Paritosh, Samar and Pakhi's father; Kinjal, Adhik's father in law (2020–present)
 Madalsa Sharma Chakraborty as Kavya Vanraj Shah, formerly Kavya Aniruddh Gandhi: Nandini's aunt; Aniruddh's ex-wife and friend; Vanraj's wife (2020–present)
 Gaurav Khanna as Anuj "AK" Kapadia: GK's foster son; Malvika's adoptive brother; Anupamaa's husband; Anu's adoptive father (2021–present)         
 Naksh Dhaval Adhyaru as young Anuj (2022)
 Paras Kalnawat as Samar "Bakuda" Shah: Anupamaa and Vanraj's son; Paritosh and Pakhi's brother; Nandini's former boyfriend; Dimple's love interest (2020–2022)
 Sagar Parekh replaced Kalnawat as Samar (2022–present)
 Vidhvaan Sharma as young Samar (2022) (archival footage of Anupama: Namaste America)

Recurring
 Nidhi Shah as Kinjal "Kinju" Dave Shah: Rakhi and Pramod's daughter; Paritosh's wife; Aarya's mother; Vanraj, Anupama's Daughter in law (2020–present)
 Ashish Mehrotra as Paritosh "Toshu" Shah; Anupamaa and Vanraj's son; Samar and Pakhi's brother; Kinjal's husband; Aarya's father (2020–present)
 Dheer Bhanushali as young Paritosh (2022) (archival footage of Anupama: Namaste America)
 Muskaan Bamne as Pakhi "Sweety" Shah Mehta: Anupamaa and Vanraj's daughter; Paritosh and Samar's sister; Adhik's wife (2020–present)
 Adhik Mehta as Adhik Mehta: Barkha's brother; Ankush and Barkha's adoptive son; Pakhi's husband; Vanraj, Anupama's Son in law  (2022–present)
 Alpana Buch as Leela Shah aka Baa: Jignesh's sister; Hasmukh's wife; Vanraj and Dolly's mother; Paritosh, Samar, Pakhi and Meenali's grandmother (2020–present)
 Arvind Vaidya as Hasmukh Shah aka Bapuji: Leela's husband; Vanraj and Dolly's father; Paritosh, Samar, Pakhi and Meenali's grandfather; GK's best friend (2020–present)
 Shekhar Shukla as Jignesh aka Mamaji: Leela's brother; Vanraj and Dolly's uncle (2020–present)
 Deepak Gheewala as Gopichand "GK" Karodia aka Gopi Kaka: Anuj and Malvika's househelp and foster father; Hasmukh's best friend (2021–present)
 Asmi Deo as Anu "Chhoti Anu" Kapadia: Maya and Sampat's daughter; Anupamaa and Anuj's adoptive daughter; Paritosh, Samar and Pakhi's adoptive sister (2022–present)
 Noorain Khan as Aarya "Pari" Shah: Kinjal and Paritosh's daughter (2022–present)
 Ekta Saraiya as Dolly Shah Dhamecha: Leela and Hasmukh's daughter; Vanraj's sister; Sanjay's wife; Meenali's mother (2020–present)
 Paresh Bhatt as Sanjay Dhamecha: Dolly's husband; Meenali's father (2020–present)
 Lavishka Gupta as Meenali "Meenu" Dhamecha: Dolly and Sanjay's daughter; Paritosh, Samar and Pakhi's cousin (2020)
 Stuti Zakarde replaced Gupta as Meenali (2020–present)
 Jasveer Kaur as Devika Mehta: Anupamaa and Anuj's best friend (2020–present)
 Tasneem Sheikh as Rakhi Dave: Pramod's wife; Kinjal's mother (2020–present)
 Madhavi Gogate as Kanta Joshi: Anupamaa and Bhavesh's mother; Paritosh, Samar, Pakhi and Nihar's grandmother (2020–2021)
 Savita Prabhune replaced Gogate (2021–present)
 Mehul Nisar as Bhavesh Joshi: Kanta's son; Anupamaa's brother; Nihar's father (2020–2021, 2022–present)
 Rushad Rana as Aniruddh Gandhi: Kavya's former husband and friend (2020–2021,2023–present)
 Rohit Bakshi as Ankush Kapadia: Malvika's cousin; Anuj's foster cousin; Barkha's husband; Sara's father; Adhik's brother-in-law and foster father (2022–present)
 Ashlesha Sawant as Barkha Mehta Kapadia: Ankush's wife; Sara's mother; Adhik's sister and foster mother (2022–present)
 Nishi Saxena as Dimple aka Dimpy: Nirmit's ex-wife; Samar's love interest (2022–present)
 Nitesh Pandey as Dheeraj – Anuj's best friend (2023)
 Amit Pachori as Mohit – Kavya's modelling photographer (2023)
 Chhavi Pandey as Uttara aka Maya – Anu's mother; a priest's daughter and a former prostitute who had an one-sided obsessive love for Anuj ; Sushma's friend; Sampat's wife.(2023–present)
 Rishabh Jaiswal as Nirmit – Dimple's former husband (2022)
 Anagha Bhosale as Nandini "Nandu" Iyer – Kavya's niece; Rohan and Samar's former girlfriend  (2020–2022)
 Aneri Vajani as Malvika "Mukku" Kapadia – Gopichandra's adoptive daughter; Anuj's foster sister; Ankush's cousin; Vanraj's former business partner and former one-sided lover (2021–2022)
 Alma Hussein as Sara Kapadia – Ankush and Barkha's daughter; Adhik's niece and foster sister; Samar's best friend; Anu's foster cousin (2022)
 Apurva Agnihotri as Dr Advait "Adi" Khanna – Owner of Blissdom's Wellness Resort; Anupamaa's doctor and mentor (2021)
 Varun Sharma as Rohan – Nandini's former boyfriend and obsessive lover (2021)
 Payal Nair as Parul Sharma – Devika's former sister-in-law; Pakhi's principal (2020–2021)
 Farukh Saeed as Pramod Dave – Rakhi's husband; Kinjal's father; Aarya's maternal grandfather  (2020)
 Parull Chaudhary as Dr. Mona Chopra – Pakhi's psychiatrist (2021)
 Bhakti Chauhan as Jhilmil – Gudiya's mother; Shah family's former househelp (2020)
 Vivan Singh Rajput as Siddharth "Sid" Desai – Pakhi's psycho classmate who blackmailed her (2020)
 Sunita Rai as Mansi Jain – Food critic at Vanraj's café (2021)
 Kiara Khantwal as Kiara – Video blogger at Vanraj's café (2021)
 Riyaz Panjwani as Mr Dholakia – Vanraj, Kavya and Kinjal's former boss who tried to molest Kinjal. (2020, 2021)
 Arup Pal as CEO – New CEO of Vanraj's office (2020, 2021)
 Tulika Patel as Kaamini – Leela's niece-in-law (2020)
 Renuka Sharma as Sushma - Maya's friend and former prostitute (2023)

Guest appearances

Production

Development
In February 2020, Rajan Shahi, the producer of Aai Kuthe Kay Karte, announced his plan to produce its Hindi remake, Anupamaa, stating, "This interesting concept around a mother's journey has been so inspirational that Star wants to bring it in Hindi too".

In early August 2020, the cast of the series recorded a special song for the Raksha Bandhan sequence titled "Aaj Rakhi Nau Tyohaar Chhe" in a Gujarati, Hindi and English fusion.

Casting

Rupali Ganguly was cast as the protagonist Anupamaa, returning to television after seven years. She said, "When I joined Anupamaa, I was a little plump and I told our producer Rajan Shahi that you want a heroine and at this age, let me lose some weight. But the producer told me that he didn't want a heroine but a mother instead. ‘I want a mother and you are perfect for the role because mothers are like this."

Sudhanshu Pandey was cast as Anupamaa's husband, Vanraj Shah. Paras Kalnawat, Muskaan Bamne, Aashish Mehrotra, Alpana Buch and Arvind Vaidya were cast as Samar Shah, Pakhi Shah, Paritosh Shah, Leela Shah and Hasmukh Shah respectively. Madhavi Gogate, Ekta Saraiya, Paresh Bhatt, Stuti Zakarde, Mehul Nisar and Bhakti Chauhan were cast to play Kanta Joshi, Dolly Shah Dhamecha, Sanjay Dhamecha, Meenali Dhamecha, Bhavesh Joshi and Jhilmil respectively. However, days before the filming resumed after the COVID-19 outbreak in late June, Additi Gupta was confirmed to be infected with the virus. She was replaced by Madalsa Sharma Chakraborty and the sequences earlier shot by Gupta were reshot by Chakraborty.

Days after premiering in July 2020, Shekhar Shukla, Nidhi Shah and Farrukh Saeed were signed to play Jignesh, Kinjal Dave and Pramod Dave respectively. Tasneem Sheikh, Anagha Bhosale were and Rushad Rana were cast as Rakhi Dave, Nandini Iyer and Aniruddh Gandhi. In April 2021, Apurva Agnihotri joined the cast as Dr. Advait Khanna for a cameo and completed his role in June 2021.

In late August 2021 Gaurav Khanna was cast as Anuj Kapadia. Khanna said that he found his character very "stylish and suave, yet rooted in motherland". He further said, "I feel my character is quite relatable. Yes, he seems to be very patient, but after a long time, audiences have seen a mature, emotionally stable, well-read and well-spoken guy, who respects women."

In September 2021, Deepak Gheewala was cast to play Gopichandra Karodia. Also that month, Varun Sharma was cast as Rohan to play a cameo and he finished off his role in October 2021. Next, Savita Prabhune replaced Madhavi Gogate as Kanta Joshi in late October 2021. In December 2021, actress Aneri Vajani joined the cast to play Malvika Kapadia.

In March 2022, Anagha Bhosale playing Nandini announced her decision to take a break from acting, however, she announced that she never quitted the show and can come back in future, but later confirmed her decision to quit acting forever thus making an end to Nandini's character and already shot her last scene in February 2022. Later that month, Aneri Vajani playing Malvika also announced that her role was just a cameo and right now its shown on a long break due to viewers' disconnect with her role's negative development.

In May 2022, singer Mika Singh made a special appearance as Anuj's friend in Anupamaa and Anuj's Mehendi and Sangeet ceremony and to promote his upcoming show Swayamvar – Mika Di Vohti. During that month, Aneri Vajani announced her decision to participate in Fear Factor: Khatron Ke Khiladi 12 and confirmed permanently quitting the series with "no scope of coming back as its all over for her role".

Later that month, Rohit Bakshi and Ashlesha Sawant were cast to play Ankush Kapadia and Barkha Kapadia respectively while Alma Hussein and Adhik Mehta were cast to play Sara Kapadia and Adhik Kapadia opposite Kalnawat and Bamne respectively. In an interview after being cast as Adhik Kapadia, Mehta revealed that "he earlier auditioned for the role of Samar (which eventually locked to Kalnawat) in the casting phase of the series but it didn't happened at that time". Child artist Asmi Deo was also cast as an orphan Anu but her track was put on hold and resumed in July 2022.

In July 2022, Paras Kalnawat signed on to appear on the dance-based reality show Jhalak Dikhhla Jaa 10 on rival network Colors TV. Anupamaa makers objected and terminated his contract overnight. Speaking on the same, Producer Rajan Shahi said, "We as a production house won’t entertain breach of contract. We have terminated his services as an actor with immediate effect. We wish him all the best for his future endeavors". While Paras said, "Everything is great with Anupamaa but I did not see my character evolving. I have huge respect for Rajan sir and the team and wish them all the best. At this stage of my career, I wanted to take up a new challenge. Also, I must add that I did inform the production about my decision, however, due to the channel and contract clauses, it wouldn’t have been possible for me to continue with Anupamaa after signing Jhalak". He further said, "My character never evolved since past one year and after Anagha's exit I was just reduced to a family member standing in background with nothing to do" and he signed off calling whatever happened was a "nightmare" and "sigh of relief" as makers asked him to choose between the two. Later after facing several controversies related to the series, makers replaced Kalnawat overnight by Sagar Parekh in the same month.

In September 2022, Alma Hussein who was cast opposite Kalnawat also quit the series quoting, "I entered the show in May and was very happy about working in this show. But soon I realised that my track was going nowhere. I also felt that I was not growing as an actor. Being so young, I want to learn as much as possible, which was not happening. Due to major twists and turns in the story in the past couple of months, and also because of Paras' exit from the show, the makers could not open the track of Sara and Samar. Instead of me just standing behind with not much to do I felt it was better to look for something worthwhile. So I spoke to Rajan Shahi sir and discussed with him. He also agreed with me. It was a mutual decisiona and it was decided that they would show Sara leaving for the US for higher studies. I am glad that he understood my point of view. So, yes, as of now I am not a part of the show."

In January 2023, actress Chhavi Pandey was cast to do an extended cameo of Anu's biological mother Maya.

Filming
Set in Gujarat, the series is mainly shot at Film City in Mumbai. Some initial sequences were shot in Ahmedabad during early March 2020.

On 13 February 2021, the filming was halted for a day for sanitisation when Paras Kalnawat playing Samar, tested positive for COVID-19 virus. The sequences of Kalnawat with Anagha Bhosale playing Nandini were cancelled including proposal sequence of their characters and were replanned until his recovery and return in late February 2021. However he shot some sequences from his home under his and his mother's quarantine period.

On 2 April 2021, Rupali Ganguly, Sudhanshu Pandey and Aashish Mehrotra who portray Anupamaa, Vanraj and Paritosh respectively and producer Rajan Shahi tested positive for COVID-19. Certain sequences were postponed and the story focused more on the characters Rakhi, Kavya and Leela while Ganguly, Pandey and Mehrotra shot for few sequences from their homes. A few days later, Tassnim Sheikh, Alpana Buch and Nidhi Shah also tested positive for COVID-19 and the story focussed more on Samar, Nandini and Pakhi's characters.

On 13 April 2021, the Chief Minister of Maharashtra, Uddhav Thackeray announced a sudden curfew due to increased Covid cases in Maharashtra, while the production halted from 14 April 2021. Hence, the production location was soon shifted temporarily to Silvassa alongside other shows like Yeh Rishta Kya Kehlata Hai, Mann Kee Awaaz Pratigya 2 and Aai Kuthe Kay Karte of the production house. In June 2021, the Maharashtra government permitted shooting within the state with certain restrictions, following which the whole cast and crew returned to Mumbai on 8 June 2021 and resumed shooting the following day.

Release
Anupamaa premiered on 13 July 2020 on Star Plus, replacing Yeh Rishtey Hain Pyaar Ke. Since 2 October 2022, it is broadcast daily along with other Star Plus's shows.

Prequel series

An eleven-episodic prequel web-series Anupama: Namaste America was released on Disney+ Hotstar on 25 April 2022. The story is set after ten years of Anupamaa and Vanraj's marriage in the year 2005.

Television special

Ravivaar With Star Parivaar (2022)

Th cast of Anupamaa participated as a team in the musical game show Ravivaar With Star Parivaar. It competed with the teams of other Star Plus's shows. Anupamaa emerged as the 2nd runner-up of the show.

Crossover
From 26 March 2022 to 28 March 2022, Anupamaa had a crossover with Yeh Rishta Kya Kehlata Hai, where Anupamaa attended Akshara and Abhimanyu's engagement. She also fought against the world for her and Anuj's relation.

Reception

Critics
The India Today stated, "Rupali Ganguly fits the character perfectly and aces the role of a Gujarati homemaker. The show strikes a chord with the homemakers as they can identify with the protagonist. Anupamaa has the right amount of emotions, drama, and spice. The show has the right mix of family values and a modern outlook. The show is a heartwarming tale".

ThePrint appreciated the series along with few other Hindi GECs based on the story of a mother mentioning that it delivered moral lessons and calling the character Anupamaa as paragon of virtue and farcical.

Controversies

Cold-war and groupism among leads controversy
The series came under a controversy for the first time in June 2021 with the alleged "Cold-war between leads Rupali Ganguly and Sudhanshu Pandey" which stated about a cold-war and groupism between cast members led by Rupali Ganguly and Sudhanshu Pandey with Alpana Buch, Ashish Mehrotra and Muskaan Bamne being under Ganguly's team while Madalsa Sharma Chakraborty, Paras Kalnawat and Anagha Bhosale under Pandey's team. However all of them denied the same on several occasions with Pandey claiming it "difference of opinions" and Chakraborty calling it "plain rumours" and "rubbish".

The rumour further escalated with "Ego clashes between leads Sudhanshu Pandey and Gaurav Khanna" however again they both denied the same with Pandey saying, "Show can't run with just one storyline".

Paras Kalnawat's controversial exit
The series again faced a controversy in July 2022 when producer Rajan Shahi terminated actor Paras Kalnawat's three-years-long contract for signing up Jhalak Dikhhla Jaa 10 on rival channel Colors TV and termed him as "unprofessional". To his defense Kalnawat claimed that "he already informed the makers about the same to which they asked him to choose between Anupamaa and Jhalak in return and he chosed the latter for his career growth claiming his ouster to be a PR Tactic" supporting his former co-actor Anagha Bhosale's allegations of "set politics" on makers and signed off calling whatever happened was a "nightmare" and "sigh of relief" and revealed many dark secrets of the production house including his return to show within five days of his father's demise as leads were tested COVID-19 positive. The controversy heated up with Kalnawat being replaced overnight by Sagar Parekh and ended up in September 2022 with Alma Hussein quitting the series who joined the cast in June 2022 opposite Kalnawat being unsatisfied with her character growth.

Adaptations
Star Plus's Anupamaa is an official Hindi remake of Star Jalsha's Sreemoyee. However its Marathi remake Aai Kuthe Kay Karte and Anupamaa both are produced by same producer Rajan Shahi under Director's Kut Productions and follows same plot.

Awards and nominations

References

External links 
 
 Anupamaa on Disney+ Hotstar
 Production Website

2020 Indian television series debuts
StarPlus original programming
Hindi-language television shows
Indian television soap operas
Television shows set in Gujarat